Arthur Eugene Fryslie (born October 25, 1940) was an American farmer and politician.

From Willow Lake, South Dakota, Fryslie graduated from Vienna High School in Vienna, South Dakota and went to South Dakota State University. Fryslie was a farmer and served in local government and in the Republican Party. Fryslie served in the South Dakota House of Representatives 1996-2006 and then the South Dakota State Senate 2009–2012. His great-grandfather was Anton Fryslie who also served in the South Dakota Legislature.

References 

1940 births
Living people
People from Clark County, South Dakota
Farmers from South Dakota
South Dakota State University alumni
Republican Party members of the South Dakota House of Representatives
Republican Party South Dakota state senators
20th-century American politicians
21st-century American politicians